Home is a British comedy-drama television series created and written by Rufus Jones that aired for two seasons, premiering on 5 March 2019, and airing its last episode on 11 March 2020. In May 2021, Channel 4 confirmed that they would not broadcast another series, with Rufus Jones saying the series may be revived in the future on another platform.

Premise
Upon returning to their detached house in Dorking, Surrey from a family holiday in France, a middle-class family find an illegal immigrant from Damascus hiding in the boot of their car. The series follows Sami as he adjusts to his new life in Britain.

Cast
Rebekah Staton as Katy
Rufus Jones as Peter Guest
Youssef Kerkour as Sami Ibrahim
Oaklee Pendergast as John

Episodes

Season 1 (2019)

Season 2 (2020)

References

External links
 

2019 British television series debuts
2020 British television series endings
2010s British comedy-drama television series
2010s British sitcoms
2020s British comedy-drama television series
2020s British sitcoms
Channel 4 comedy dramas
Channel 4 sitcoms
Dorking
English-language television shows
Television series about immigration
Television series about couples
Television series about dysfunctional families
Television shows set in London
Television shows set in Surrey
Works about the European migrant crisis